The 2016 Israel Open was a professional tennis tournament played on hard courts. It was the 5th edition of the tournament, which was part of the 2016 ATP Challenger Tour. It took place in Ra'anana, Israel between 28 March and 3 April.

Singles main-draw entrants

Seeds

 1 Rankings are as of March 21, 2016

Other entrants
The following players received wildcards into the singles main draw:
  Dekel Bar
  Daniel Cukierman
  Tal Goldengoren
  Edan Leshem

The following players received entry as alternates:
  Gerard Granollers
  Denys Molchanov

The following players received entry from the qualifying draw:
  Lucas Miedler
  Alexis Musialek
  Frederik Nielsen
  Gianluigi Quinzi

Champions

Singles

 Evgeny Donskoy def.  Ričardas Berankis, 6–4, 6–4

Doubles

 Konstantin Kravchuk /  Denys Molchanov def.  Jonathan Erlich /  Philipp Oswald, 4–6, 7–6(7–1), [10–4]

References
 Combined Main Draw

External links
Official Website

Electra Israel Open
2016 in Israeli sport
Israel Open